Jain literature (Sanskrit: जैन साहित्य) refers to the literature of the Jain religion. It is a vast and ancient literary tradition, which was initially transmitted orally. The oldest surviving material is contained in the canonical Jain Agamas, which are written in Ardhamagadhi, a Prakrit (Middle-Indo Aryan) language. Various commentaries were written on these canonical texts by later Jain monks. Later works were also written in other languages, like Sanskrit and Maharashtri Prakrit.

Jain literature is primarily divided between the canons of the Digambara and Śvētāmbara orders. These two main sects of Jainism do not always agree on which texts should be considered authoritative.

More recent Jain literature has also been written in other languages, like Marathi, Tamil, Rajasthani, Dhundari, Marwari, Hindi, Gujarati, Kannada, Malayalam and more recently in English.

Beliefs
The Jain tradition believes that their religion is eternal, and the teachings of the first Tirthankara Rishabhanatha existed millions of years ago. It states that the tirthankaras taught in divine preaching halls called samavasarana, which were heard by gods, ascetics and laypersons. These divine discourses were called Śhrut Jnāna (or heard knowledge) and always comprises eleven angas and fourteen purvas. The discourses are remembered and transmitted by the Ganadharas (chief disciples), and is composed of twelve angas (parts, limbs). It is symbolically represented by a tree with twelve branches. The spoken scriptural language is believed to be Ardhamagadhi by the Śvētāmbara Jains, and a form of divine sound or sonic resonance by the Digambara Jains.

According to the Jain tradition, the divine Śhrut Jnāna of a tirthankara is then converted into sutta (scripture) by his disciples, and from such suttas emerge the formal canons. The suttas are grouped into duvala samgagani pidaga (twelve limbed baskets), which are transmitted orally by the disciples. In every universal cycle of Jain cosmology, twenty-four tirthankaras appear and so do the Jain scriptures for that cycle.

History 

Initially, the canonical scriptures were transmitted through an oral tradition and consisted of teachings of historical Jain leaders like Mahavira codified into various collections. Gautama and other Gandhars (the chief disciples of Mahavira) are said to have compiled the original sacred scriptures which were divided into twelve Angas or parts. They are referred to as the eleven Angas and the fourteen Pūrvas, since the twelfth Anga comprises fourteen Pūrvas. These scriptures are said to have contained the most comprehensive and accurate description of every branch of Jain learning. The Jain Agamas and their commentaries were composed mainly in Ardhamagadhi Prakrit as well as in Maharashtri Prakrit.

While some authors date the composition of the Jain Agamas starting from the 6th century BCE, some western scholars, such as Ian Whicher and David Carpenter, argue that the earliest portions of Jain canonical works were composed around the 4th or 3rd century BCE. According to Johannes Bronkhorst it is extremely difficult to determine the age of the Jain Agamas, however:Mainly on linguistic grounds, it has been argued that the Ācārāṅga Sūtra, the Sūtrakṛtāṅga Sūtra, and the Uttarādhyayana Sūtra are among the oldest texts in the canon. This does not guarantee that they actually date from the time of Mahāvīra, nor even from the centuries immediately following his death, nor does it guarantee that all parts of these texts were composed simultaneously.Elsewhere, Bronkhorst states that the Sūtrakṛtāṅga "dates from the 2nd century BCE at the very earliest," based on how it references the Buddhist theory of momentariness, which is a later scholastic development.

During the reign of Chandragupta Maurya (c. 324 or 321 – c. 297 BCE), Āchārya Bhadrabahu (c. 367 - c. 298 BCE), said to have been the last knower of the complete Jain agamas, was the head of Jain community. At this time, a long famine caused a crisis in the community, who found it difficult to keep the entire Jain canon committed to memory. Bhadrabahu decided to travel south to Karnataka with his adherents and Sthulabhadra, another Jain leader remained behind. The famine decimated the Jain community, leading to the loss of many canonical texts. According to Śvētāmbara ("white-clad") tradition, the agamas were collected on the basis of the collective memory of the ascetics in the first council of Pataliputra under the stewardship of Sthulibhadra in around to 463–367 BCE. During the council, eleven scriptures called Angas were compiled and the remnant of fourteen purvas were written down in a 12th Anga. Another council was later organised in 2nd-century BCE in Udayagiri and Khandagiri Caves, Kalinga (now in Odisha) during the reign of Kharavela.

The Śvētāmbara order considers these Jain Agamas as canonical works and sees them as being based on an authentic oral tradition. They consider their collection to represent a continuous tradition, though they accept that their collection is also incomplete because of a lost Anga text and four lost Purva texts.

However, these texts were rejected by the Digambara (lit. "sky-clad", i.e. naked) order, which hold that Āchārya Bhutabali (1st Century CE) was the last ascetic who had partial knowledge of the original canon. According to Digambaras, the Purvas and the original Agamas of Gautama were lost during the Mauryan period crisis and famine. This Digambara stance on the loss of the Agamas is one of the disagreements that led to the main schism in Jainism. Digambara masters proceeded to create new scriptures which contained the knowledge of the doctrine that had survived in their community. As such, Digambaras have a different set of canonical scriptures. According to von Glasenapp, the Digambara texts partially agree with the enumerations and works of older Śvētāmbara texts, but in many cases there are also major differences between the texts of the two major Jain traditions.

The Śvētāmbara Siddhāntha 

In 453 or 466 CE, the Śvētāmbara order held another council at Vallabhi. The Śvētāmbaras recompiled the Agamas and recorded them as written manuscripts under the leadership of Acharya Shraman Devardhigani along with other 500 Jain scholars. The existing Śvētāmbara canons are based on the Vallabhi council texts.

From the 15th century onwards, various Śvetāmbara subsects began to disagree on the composition of the canon. Mūrtipūjaks ("idol-worshippers") accept 45 texts, while the Sthānakavāsins and Terāpanthins only accept 32.

List of works
The canons (Siddhāntha) of the Śvētāmbaras are generally composed of the following texts:
 Twelve Angās (limbs)
 Āyāraṃga (Sanskrit: Ācāranga, meaning: ‘On monastic conduct’) 
 Sūyagaḍa (Sūtrakṛtāṅga, ‘On heretical systems and views’) 
 Ṭhāṇaṃga (Sthānāṅga, ‘On different points [of the teaching]’) 
 Samavāyaṃga (Samavāyāṅga, ‘On "rising numerical groups"’)
 Viyāha-pannatti / Bhagavaī (Vyākhyā-prajñapti or Bhagavatī, ‘Exposition of explanations’ or ‘the holy one’)
 Nāyā-dhamma-kahāo (Jñāta-dharmakathānga, ‘Parables and religious stories’)
 Uvāsaga-dasāo (Upāsaka-daśāḥ,‘Ten chapters on the Jain lay follower’)
 Aṇuttarovavāiya-dasāo (Antakṛd-daśāḥ, ‘Ten chapters on those who put an end to rebirth in this very life’)
 Anuttaraupapātikadaśāh (Anuttaropapātika-daśāḥ, ‘Ten chapters on those who were reborn in the uppermost heavens’)
 Paṇha-vāgaraṇa (Praśna-vyākaraṇa, ‘Questions and explanations’)
 Vivāga-suya (Vipākaśruta,‘Bad or good results of deeds performed’)
Twelve Upāṅgas (auxiliary limbs)
Uvavāiya-sutta (Sanskrit: Aupapātika-sūtra,‘Places of rebirth’)
Rāya-paseṇaijja or Rāyapaseṇiya (Rāja-praśnīya, ‘Questions of the king’)
Jīvājīvābhigama (Jīvājīvābhigama, ‘Classification of animate and inanimate entities’)
Pannavaṇā (Prajñāpanā, ‘Enunciation on topics of philosophy and ethics’)
Sūriya-pannatti (Sūrya-prajñapti, ‘Exposition on the sun’)
Jambūdvīpa-pannatti (Jambūdvīpa-prajñapti, ‘Exposition on the Jambū continent and the Jain universe’)
Canda-pannatti (Candra-prajñapti, ‘Exposition on the moon and the Jain universe’)
Nirayāvaliyāo or Kappiya (Narakāvalikā, ‘Series of stories on characters reborn in hells’)
Kappāvaḍaṃsiāo (Kalpāvataṃsikāḥ, ‘Series of stories on characters reborn in the kalpa heavens’)
Pupphiāo (Puṣpikāḥ, ‘Flowers’ refers to one of the stories’)
Puppha-cūliāo (Puṣpa-cūlikāḥ, ‘The nun Puṣpacūlā’)
Vaṇhi-dasāo (Vṛṣṇi-daśāh, ‘Stories on characters from the legendary dynasty known as Andhaka-Vṛṣṇi’)
 Six Chedasūtras (Texts relating to the conduct and behaviour of monks and nuns)
 Āyāra-dasāo (Sanskrit: Ācāradaśāh, ‘Ten [chapters] about monastic conduct’, chapter 8 is the famed Kalpa-sūtra.)
 Bihā Kappa (Bṛhat Kalpa, ‘[Great] Religious code’)
 Vavahāra (Vyavahāra, ‘Procedure’)
 Nisīha (Niśītha, ‘Interdictions’)
 Jīya-kappa (Jīta-kalpa, Customary rules), only accepted as canonical by Mūrti-pūjaks
 Mahā-nisīha (Mahā-niśītha, Large Niśītha), only accepted as canonical by Mūrti-pūjaks
 Four Mūlasūtras (‘Fundamental texts’ which are foundational works studied by new monastics)
 Dasaveyāliya-sutta (Sanskrit: Daśavaikālika-sūtra), this is memorized by all new Jain mendicants 
 Uttarajjhayaṇa-sutta (Uttarādhyayana-sūtra)
 Āvassaya-sutta (Āvaśyaka-sūtra)
 Piṇḍa-nijjutti and Ogha-nijjutti (Piṇḍa-niryukti and Ogha-niryukti), only accepted as canonical by Mūrti-pūjaks
 Two Cūlikasūtras ("appendixes")
 Nandī-sūtra - discusses the five types of knowledge
 Anuyogadvāra-sūtra - a technical treatise on analytical methods, discusses Anekantavada

Miscellaneous collections
To reach the number 45, Mūrtipūjak Śvētāmbara canons contain a "Miscellaneous" collection of supplementary texts, called the Paiṇṇaya suttas (Sanskrit: Prakīrnaka sūtras, "Miscellaneous"). This section varies in number depending on the individual sub-sect (from 10 texts to over 20). They also often included extra works (often of disputed authorship) named "supernumerary Prakīrṇakas". The Paiṇṇaya texts are generally not considered to have the same kind of authority as the other works in the canon. Most of these works are in Jaina Māhārāṣṭrī Prakrit, unlike the other Śvetāmbara scriptures which tend to be in Ardhamāgadhī. They are therefore most likely later works than the Aṅgas and Upāṅgas.

Mūrtipūjak Jain canons will generally accept 10 Paiṇṇayas as canonical, but there is widespread disagreement on which 10 scriptures are given canonical status. The most widely accepted list of ten scriptures are the following:

Cau-saraṇa (Sanskrit: Catuḥśaraṇa, The ‘four refuges’)
Āura-paccakkhāṇa (Ātura-pratyākhyāna, ‘Sick man’s renunciation’)
Bhatta-parinnā (Bhakta-parijñā,‘Renunciation of food’)
Saṃthāraga (Saṃstāraka, ‘Straw bed’)
Tandula-veyāliya (Taṇḍula-vaicārika,‘Reflection on rice grains’)
Canda-vejjhaya (Candravedhyaka, ‘Hitting the mark’)
Devinda-tthaya (Devendra-stava, ‘Praise of the kings of gods’)
Gaṇi-vijjā (Gaṇi-vidyā,‘A Gaṇi’s knowledge’)
Mahā-paccakkhāṇa (Mahā-pratyākhyāna,‘Great renunciation’)
Vīra-tthava (Vīra-stava,‘Great renunciation’)

The Digambara Siddhāntha 

According to the Digambara tradition, the original scriptures had been lost by about the 2nd century CE. Āchārya Bhutabali is considered the last ascetic who had some partial knowledge of the original canon. Digambara tradition holds that Āchārya Dharasena (1st century CE), guided Āchārya Pushpadanta and Āchārya Bhutabali to write what remained of the lost teachings down into palm-leaf scriptures. These two Āchāryas wrote the Ṣaṭkhaṅḍāgama (Six Part Scripture), which is held to be one of the oldest Digambara texts. They are dated to between the 2nd to 3rd century CE. Around the same time, Āchārya Gunadhar wrote Kaşāyapāhuda (Treatise on the Passions). These two texts are the two main Digambara Agamas.

The Digambara canon of scriptures includes these two main texts, three commentaries on the main texts, and four (later) Anuyogas (expositions), consisting of more than 20 texts.

The great commentator Virasena wrote two commentary texts on the Ṣaṭkhaṅḍāgama, the Dhaval‑tika on the first five volumes and Maha‑dhaval‑tika on the sixth volume of the Ṣaṭkhaṅḍāgama, around 780 CE. Virasena and his disciple, Jinasena, also wrote a commentary on the Kaşāyapāhuda, known as Jaya‑dhavala‑tika.

There is no agreement on the canonical Anuyogas ("Expositions"). The Anuyogas were written between the 2nd and the 11th centuries CE, either in Jaina Śaurasenī Prakrit or in Sanskrit.

The expositions (Anuyogas) are divided into four literary categories:

 The 'first' (Prathamānuyoga) category contains various works such as Jain versions of the Rāmāyaṇa (like the 7th-century Padma-purāṇa by Raviṣeṇa) and Mahābhārata (like Jinasena's 8th century Harivaṃśa-purāṇa), as well as ‘Jain universal histories’ (like Jinasena's 8th-century Ādi-purāṇa).
 The 'calculation' (Karaṇānuyoga) expositions are mainly works on Jain cosmology (such as Tiloya-paṇṇatti of Yati Vṛṣabha, dating from the 6th to 7th century) and karma (for example, Nemicandra's Gommaṭa-sāra). The Gommatsāra of Nemichandra (fl. 10th century) is one of the most important Digambara works and provides a detailed summary of Digambara doctrine.
 The 'behaviour' (Caraṇānuyoga) expositions are texts about proper behaviour, such as Vaṭṭakera's Mūlācāra (on monastic conduct, 2nd century) and the Ratnakaraṇḍaka-Śrāvakācāra by Samantabhadra (5th-century) which focuses on the ethics of a layperson. Works in this category also treat the purity of the soul, such as the work of Kundakunda like the Samaya-sāra, the Pancastikayasara, and Niyamasara. These works by Kundakunda (2nd century CE or later) are highly revered and have been historically influential. 
 The 'substance' (Dravyānuyoga) exposition includes texts about ontology of the universe and self. Umāsvāmin's comprehensive Tattvārtha-sūtra is the standard work on ontology and Pūjyapāda's (464–524 CE) Sarvārthasiddhi is one of the most influential Digambara commentaries on the Tattvārtha. This collection also includes various works on epistemology and reasoning, such as Samantabhadra's Āpta-mīmāṃsā and the works of Akalaṅka (720-780 CE), such as his commentary on the Apta-mīmāṃsā and his Nyāya-viniścaya.

Post-Canonical literature

Doctrinal and philosophical works
There are various later Jain works that are considered post-canonical, that is to say, they were written after the closure of the Jain canons, though the different canons were closed at different historical eras, and so this category is ambiguous.

Thus, Umaswati's (c. between 2nd-century and 5th-century CE) Tattvarthasūtra ("On the Nature of Reality") is included in the Digambara canon, but not in the Śvētāmbara canons (though they do consider the work authoritative). Indeed, the Tattvarthasūtra is considered the authoritative Jain philosophy text by all traditions of Jainism. It has the same importance in Jainism as Vedanta Sūtras and Yogasūtras have in Hinduism.

Other non-canonical works include various texts attributed to Bhadrabahu (c. 300 BCE) which are called the Niryuktis and Samhitas.

According to Winternitz, after the 8th century or so, Svetambara Jain writers, who had previously worked in Prakrit, began to use Sanskrit. The Digambaras also adopted Sanskrit somewhat earlier. The earliest Jain works in Sanskrit include the writings of Siddhasēna Divākara (c. 650 CE), who wrote the Sanmatitarka (‘The Logic of the True Doctrine’) is the first major Jain work on logic written in Sanskrit.

Other later works and writers include:

 Jinabhadra (6th–7th century) – author of Avasyaksutra (Jain tenets) Visesanavati and Visesavasyakabhasya (Commentary on Jain essentials).
 Mallavadin (8th century) – author of Nayacakra and Dvadasaranayacakra (Encyclopedia of Philosophy) which discusses the schools of Indian philosophy. 
 Haribhadra-sūri (c 8th century) is an important Svetambara scholar who wrote commentaries on the Agamas. He also wrote the Yogadṛṣṭisamuccaya, a key Jain text on Yoga which compares the Yoga systems of Buddhists, Hindus and Jains. Gunaratna (c. 1400 CE) wrote a commentary on Haribhadra's work. 
 Prabhacandra (8th–9th century) – Jain philosopher, composed a 106-Sutra Tattvarthasutra and exhaustive commentaries on two key works on Jain Nyaya, Prameyakamalamartanda, based on Manikyanandi's Parikshamukham and Nyayakumudacandra on Akalanka's Laghiyastraya. 
 Abhayadeva (1057–1135 CE) –  author of Vadamahrnava (Ocean of Discussions) which is a 2,500 verse tika (Commentary) of Sanmartika and a great treatise on logic. 
 Hemachandra (c. 1088-1172 CE) wrote the Yogaśāstra, a textbook on yoga and Adhatma Upanishad. His minor work Vitragastuti gives outlines of the Jaina doctrine in form of hymns. This was later detailed by Mallisena (c. 1292 CE) in his work Syadavadamanjari. 
 Vadideva (11th century) – He was a senior contemporary of Hemacandra and is said to have authored Paramananayatattavalokalankara and its voluminous commentary syadvadaratnakara that establishes the supremacy of doctrine of Syādvāda. 
 There are also other important commentators on the Agamas, including Abhayadeva-sūri (c. 11th century) and Malayagiri (c. the 12th century). 
 Vidyanandi (11th century) – Jain philosopher, composed the brilliant commentary on Acarya Umasvami's Tattvarthasutra, known as Tattvarthashlokavartika. 
 Devendrasuri wrote the Karmagrantha which is an exposition of the Jain theory of Karma. 
 Yaśovijaya (1624–1688) was a Jain scholar of Navya-Nyāya and wrote Vrttis (commentaries) on most of the earlier Jain Nyāya works by Samantabhadra, Akalanka, Manikyanandi, Vidyānandi, Prabhācandra and others in the then-prevalent Navya-Nyāya style. Yaśovijaya has to his credit a prolific literary output – more than 100 books in Sanskrit, Prakrit, Gujarati and Rajasthani. He is also famous for Jnanasara (essence of knowledge) and Adhayatmasara (essence of spirituality). 
 The Lokaprakasa of Vinayavijaya was written in the 17th century CE.
 Srivarddhaeva (aka Tumbuluracarya) wrote a Kannada commentary on Tattvarthadigama-sutra. 
Atmasiddhi Shastra is a spiritual treatise in verse, composed in Gujarati by the nineteenth century Jain saint, philosopher poet Shrimad Rajchandraji (1867-1901) which comprises 142 verses explaining the fundamental philosophical truths about the soul and its liberation. It propounds six fundamental truth on soul which are also known as Satapada (six steps).
The Saman Suttam is a compilation of ancient texts and doctrines recognised by all Jain sects, assembled primarily by Jinendra Varni and then examined and approved by monks of different sects and other scholars in 1974.

Grammar 
Jainendra-vyakarana of Acharya Pujyapada and Sakatayana-vyakarana of Sakatayana are both works on grammar written in c. 9th century CE.

Siddha-Hem-Shabdanushasana" by Acharya Hemachandra (c. 12th century CE) is considered by F. Kielhorn as the best grammar work of the Indian middle age. Hemacandra's book Kumarapalacaritra is also noteworthy.

Narrative literature and poetry
Jaina narrative literature mainly contains stories about sixty-three prominent figures known as Salakapurusa, and people who were related to them. Some of the important works are Harivamshapurana of Jinasena (c. 8th century CE), Vikramarjuna-Vijaya (also known as Pampa-Bharata) of Kannada poet named Adi Pampa (c. 10th century CE), Pandavapurana of Shubhachandra (c. 16th century CE).

Mathematics
Jain literature covered multiple topics of mathematics around 150 AD including the theory of numbers, arithmetical operations, geometry, operations with fractions, simple equations, cubic equations, bi-quadric equations, permutations, combinations and logarithms.

Languages 
Jains literature exists mainly in Jain Prakrit, Sanskrit, Marathi, Tamil, Rajasthani, Dhundari, Marwari, Hindi, Gujarati, Kannada, Malayalam, and more recently in English.

Jains have contributed to India's classical and popular literature. For example, almost all early Kannada literature and many Tamil works were written by Jains. Some of the oldest known books in Hindi and Gujarati were written by Jain scholars.

The first autobiography in the ancestor of Hindi, Braj Bhasha, is called Ardhakathānaka and was written by a Jain, Banarasidasa, an ardent follower of Acarya Kundakunda who lived in Agra. Many Tamil classics are written by Jains or with Jain beliefs and values as the core subject. Practically all the known texts in the Apabhramsha language are Jain works.

The oldest Jain literature is in Shauraseni and the Jain Prakrit (the Jain Agamas, Agama-Tulya, the Siddhanta texts, etc.). Many classical texts are in Sanskrit (Tattvartha Sutra, Puranas, Kosh, Sravakacara, mathematics, Nighantus etc.). "Abhidhana Rajendra Kosha" written by Acharya Rajendrasuri, is only one available Jain encyclopedia or Jain dictionary to understand the Jain Prakrit, Ardha-Magadhi and other languages, words, their use and references within oldest Jain literature.

Jain literature was written in Apabhraṃśa (Kahas, rasas, and grammars), Standard Hindi (Chhahadhala, Moksh Marg Prakashak, and others), Tamil (Nālaṭiyār, Civaka Cintamani, Valayapathi, and others), and Kannada (Vaddaradhane and various other texts). Jain versions of the Ramayana and Mahabharata are found in Sanskrit, the Prakrits, Apabhraṃśa and Kannada.

Jain Prakrit is a term loosely used for the language of the Jain Agamas (canonical texts). The books of Jainism were written in the popular vernacular dialects (as opposed to Sanskrit which was the classical standard of Brahmanism), and therefore encompass a number of related dialects. Chief among these is Ardha Magadhi, which due to its extensive use has also come to be identified as the definitive form of Prakrit. Other dialects include versions of Maharashtri and Sauraseni.

Influence on Indian literature

Parts of the Sangam literature in Tamil are attributed to Jains. The authenticity and interpolations are controversial because it presents Hindu ideas. Some scholars state that the Jain portions were added about or after the 8th century CE, and are not ancient. Tamil Jain texts such as the Cīvaka Cintāmaṇi and Nālaṭiyār are credited to Digambara Jain authors. These texts have seen interpolations and revisions. For example, it is generally accepted now that the Jain nun Kanti inserted a 445-verse poem into Cīvaka Cintāmaṇi in the 12th century. The Tamil Jain literature, according to Dundas, has been "lovingly studied and commented upon for centuries by Hindus as well as Jains". The themes of two of the Tamil epics, including the Silapadikkaram, have an embedded influence of Jainism.

Jain scholars also contributed to Kannada literature. The Digambara Jain texts in Karnataka are unusual in having been written under the patronage of kings and regional aristocrats. They describe warrior violence and martial valor as equivalent to a "fully committed Jain ascetic", setting aside Jainism's absolute non-violence.

Jain manuscript libraries called bhandaras inside Jain temples are the oldest surviving in India. Jain libraries, including the Śvētāmbara collections at Patan, Gujarat and Jaiselmer, Rajasthan, and the Digambara collections in Karnataka temples, have a large number of well-preserved manuscripts. These include Jain literature and Hindu and Buddhist texts. Almost all have been dated to about, or after, the 11th century CE. The largest and most valuable libraries are found in the Thar Desert, hidden in the underground vaults of Jain temples. These collections have witnessed insect damage, and only a small portion have been published and studied by scholars.

See also 

 Champat Rai Jain
 A.N. Upadhye
 Bal Patil
 Agama (Hinduism)
 Āgama (Buddhism)

Notes

References

Citations

Sources
 
 
 
 
 
 
 
 
 
 
 
 

 
 
  Alt URL

Further reading

External links
 Jain Shastras. 
 
 Clay Sanskrit Library 

 
Religious literature
Jain texts